Cao Juru (May 1901 – January 1981) was the 2nd governor of the People's Bank of China (1954–1964). He was born in Longyan, Fujian Province. He joined the Chinese Communist Party in 1930.

References

1901 births
1981 deaths
Governors of the People's Bank of China
People from Longyan
Members of the 5th Chinese People's Political Consultative Conference
Delegates to the 2nd National People's Congress
Delegates to the National People's Congress from Qinghai